The 2018 Oregon Ducks football team represented the University of Oregon during the 2018 NCAA Division I FBS football season. The team was led by first-year head coach Mario Cristobal who took over for Willie Taggart who departed for Florida State. Oregon played their games at Autzen Stadium and competed as members of the North Division of the Pac-12 Conference.

Coming off a 7–6 season under Taggart in 2017, Oregon began the year ranked 24th in the preseason AP Poll. After sweeping their non-conference slate, they fell to then-No. 7 Stanford in overtime. The team bounced back with wins over No. 24 California and No. 7 Washington and rose to 12th in the polls before losing three of their next four games. The Ducks finished the regular season in fourth in the Pac-12 North Division with a conference record of 5–4. They were invited to the Redbox Bowl, where they defeated Michigan State to end the year at 9–4 overall.

The Oregon offense was led by junior quarterback Justin Herbert, who finished in second the Pac-12 Conference with 31 total touchdowns (29 passing and 2 rushing). Running back C. J. Verdell finished with 1,018 rushing yards and 10 rushing touchdowns. Defensively, the team was led by defensive end Jalen Jelks, who was named first-team all-conference.

Previous season
The Ducks finished the 2017 season 7–6, 4–5 in Pac-12 play to finish in fourth place in the North Division. They were invited to the Las Vegas Bowl where they lost to Boise State 28–38.

Recruiting

Position Key

Recruits

Preseason

Award watch lists
Listed in the order that they were released

Pac-12 Media Days
The 2018 Pac-12 media days are set for July 25, 2018 in Hollywood, California. Mario Cristobal (HC), Justin Herbert (QB) & Jalen Jelks (DL) at Pac-12 Media Days. The Pac-12 media poll was released with the Ducks predicted to finish in third place at Pac-12 North division.

Schedule

Personnel

Game summaries

Bowling Green

Portland State

San Jose State

Stanford

at California

Washington

at Washington State

at Arizona

UCLA

at Utah

Arizona State

at Oregon State

vs. Michigan State (Redbox Bowl)

Rankings

Players drafted into the NFL

References

Oregon
Oregon Ducks football seasons
Redbox Bowl champion seasons
Oregon Ducks football